Articulated Wall is a sculpture by Herbert Bayer, installed in Denver, Colorado.

References

Outdoor sculptures in Denver